Melos was a village of ancient Acarnania mentioned by Stephanus of Byzantium.

Its site is unlocated.

References

Populated places in ancient Acarnania
Former populated places in Greece
Lost ancient cities and towns